Ochiai Dam is a gravity dam located in Yamagata Prefecture in Japan. The dam is used for power production. The catchment area of the dam is 371.5 km2. The dam impounds about 9  ha of land when full and can store 656 thousand cubic meters of water. The construction of the dam was completed in 1958.

References

Dams in Yamagata Prefecture
1958 establishments in Japan